G̲h̲ulām Jīlānī Barq (Urdu: ‎; 26 October 1901, Basal, Attock District - 12 March 1985, Attock) was an 20th Century Pakistani Islamic scholar, theologian, educator, scholar, author and translator.

Early life and education 
Ghulam Jilani Barq was born on 26 October 1901 in Attock District to Muhammad Qasim Shah. Barq completed his education in his hometown, Attock where he was living with his uncle, his father used to live out of the town due to his official work. From Madrassas to universities, he won gold medal in Arabic language.  Barq wrote his thesis on Ibn Taymiyyah in English, which was ratified in 1940 by universities such as Harvard and Oxford. According to Pakistani journalist Javed Chaudhry, Barq was one of the twenty scholars who had Ph.D degree in 1940 before the creation of Pakistan.

Works 
Ghulam Jilani Barq has written several books including:

 Imām Ibn-i Taymiyyah (Book on Ibn Taymiyyah)
 Dānish-i Rūmī o Saʻdī (Rumi and Saadi)
 Merī dāstān-i ḥayāt (My life story)
 Yūrap par Islām ke iḥsān (The blessings of Islam on Europe)
 Falsafiyān-i Islām (Philosophy of Islam)
 Ḍākṭar G̲h̲ulām̲ Jīlānī Barq ke k̲h̲ut̤ūt̤ (Letters from Dr. Ghulam Jilani Barq)
 Barq-i betāb: Ḍākṭar G̲h̲ulām̲ Jīlānī Barq kā kalām 
 Maz̤āmīn-i Barq: 1926 tā qayām-i Pākistān
 Do Qurʼān
 Islam, the Religion of Humanity
 Mann Ki Duniya

Death 
Barq passed away on 12 March 1985 in Attock.

External links 
 Books by Ghulam Jilani Barq (In Urdu language)

Bibliography

References

1901 births
1985 deaths
Pakistani Sunni Muslim scholars of Islam
People from Attock District